José Zúñiga (born April 1, 1965) is a Honduran-American actor.

Filmography

Films

Television

Law & Order (1992–2006) as Detective Borough Investigator / Christoff / Detective Mark Rivera / Rudy Amendariz
NYPD Blue (1994) as Bobby Ruiz
New York Undercover (1994–1996) as Jimmy Torres
The Cosby Mysteries (1995) as Espinosa Spinoza
Nothing Sacred (1997–1998) as 'J.A.' Ortiz
Sins of the City (1998) as Freddie Corillo
For Love or Country: The Arturo Sandoval Story (2000, TV Movie) as Paquito D'Rivera
Snow White: The Fairest of Them All (2001, TV Movie) as Hector
That's Life (2001–2002) as Ray Orozco
Law & Order: Special Victims Unit (2001–2004) as CSU Tech / Computer Forensics Technician / Miguel Cruz
CSI: Miami (2003-2008) as Juan Ortega / Carl Galaz
Century City (2004) as Attorney Randall Purgaman
ER (2004) as Eduardo Lopez
CSI: Crime Scene Investigation (2004–2010) as Chris Cavaliere
The Shield (2005) as Gino
Bones (2005) as Mickey Santana
Dexter (2006) as Jorge Castillo
Prison Break (2006) as Coyote
The O.C. (2006–2007) as Jason Spitz
Saving Grace (2007) as Ronnie
Numb3rs (2007) as Bernardo Infante
NCIS (2007) as Dr. Adrian De La Casa
Ghost Whisperer (2008–2010) as Officer Luis Simon / Officer Reed Simonds
Grey's Anatomy (2009) as Anthony Meloy
Castle (2010) as Alfredo Quintana
Law & Order: Criminal Intent (2010) as Senator Victor Caldera
Childrens Hospital (2010) as Gang Boss
The Event (2011) as Carlos Geller
Suits (2011) as Harry the Cab Driver
Person of Interest (2012) as Vargas
Desperate Housewives(2012) as Detective Heredia
Scandal (2012) as General Benicio Florez
House (2012) as Nate Weinmann
Taxi Brooklyn (2014) as Detective Eddie Esposito
The Last Ship (2014) as El Toro
How to Get Away with Murder (2015) as Jorge Castillo
The Night Shift (2015) as Frank
Criminal Minds (2015) as Al Eisenmund
From Dusk Till Dawn: The Series (2016) as Emilio
Agents of S.H.I.E.L.D. (2016) as Eli Morrow
Notorious (2016) as Raul Mora
Madam Secretary (2016-2019) as Vice President Carlos Morejon
The Assassination of Gianni Versace: American Crime Story (2018) as Detective George Navarro
Hawaii Five-0 (2019) as Flores
The Expanse (2020-2021) as Bull - Tycho Chief of Ops
Narcos: Mexico (2021) as Jesus Gutierrez Rebollo
Chicago P.D. (2022) as Javier Escano
Westworld (2022) as Vice President
Quantum Leap as Commander Jim Reynolds - S1/E2 - "Atlantis"

References

External links
 

Living people
American male film actors
American male television actors
Honduran emigrants to the United States
Hispanic and Latino American male actors
1965 births
20th-century American male actors
21st-century American male actors
People from Tegucigalpa